Sindicato de Trabajadores de la Industria de la Bebida y Similares (Spanish for Union of Beverage and Related Industry Workers) is a trade union in Honduras founded in 1959. It is affiliated to FUTH, a trade union congress, and internationally to the IUF. STIBYS is working together with other left-wing organizations in the CNRP (National Coordination of Civil Resistance) and has been active in the resistance against the 2009 Honduras coup d'état.

The current general secretary of STIBYS is Carlos Humberto Reyes, who is standing in the November 2009 elections as an independent presidential candidate.

References

Trade unions in Honduras
World Federation of Trade Unions
Food processing trade unions